Grzegorz Baran  (born 23 December 1982) is a Polish professional footballer who plays for Polish IV liga side JKS 1909 Jarosław.

References

External links
 
 

1982 births
People from Przemyśl
Sportspeople from Podkarpackie Voivodeship
Living people
Polish footballers
Association football defenders
JKS 1909 Jarosław players
Ruch Chorzów players
MKS Cracovia (football) players
Górnik Wieliczka players
GKS Bełchatów players
Sandecja Nowy Sącz players
Ekstraklasa players
I liga players
IV liga players